Ch'aki Mayu (Quechua ch'aki dry, mayu river, "dry river", also spelled Chaqui Mayu) is a  mountain in the Bolivian Andes. It is located in the Chuquisaca Department, Oropeza Province, Sucre Municipality.

References 

Mountains of Chuquisaca Department